Gorakhpur–Pune Express is a weekly Mail/Express train of the Indian Railways, running between  of Pune, the important city of Maharashtra and  of Gorakhpur, the prominent city of Uttar Pradesh. Gorakhpur–Pune Express shares its rake with Gyan Ganga Express. 11037 Gorakhpur–Pune Express leaves Pune Junction on Thursday at 16:15. 11038 Gorakhpur–Pune Express leaves Gorakhpur Junction on Saturday at 15:30. Gorakhpur–Pune Express consists of 23 coaches – one AC-II coach, two AC-III coaches, 13 sleeper class coaches, one pantry coach, four general (unreserved) coaches and two SLR.

Coach composition

Journey

See also
 Mau Express
 Bapu Dham Superfast Express
 Kanpur Shatabdi
 Gyan Ganga Express

External links
Pune Gorakhpur Express Time Table

Express trains in India
Passenger trains originating from Gorakhpur
Rail transport in Maharashtra
Rail transport in Madhya Pradesh
Transport in Pune
Railway services introduced in 2006